The Arizona Sting are a lacrosse team based in Phoenix, Arizona playing in the National Lacrosse League (NLL). The 2007 season was the 7th in franchise history and 4th as the Sting (formerly the Columbus Landsharks).

In 2007, the Sting finished 3rd in the west, but defeated both Calgary and San Jose in the playoffs to make it to the Championship game for the second time in three years. The East division champion Rochester Knighthawks won home field advantage but due to scheduling problems in Rochester, the Sting hosted the championship game. The Knighthawks defeated the Sting 13-11 to win their first NLL Championship in ten years.

Regular season

Conference standings

Game log
Reference:

Playoffs

Game log
Reference:

Player stats
Reference:

Runners (Top 10)

Note: GP = Games played; G = Goals; A = Assists; Pts = Points; LB = Loose Balls; PIM = Penalty minutes

Goaltenders
Note: GP = Games played; MIN = Minutes; W = Wins; L = Losses; GA = Goals against; Sv% = Save percentage; GAA = Goals against average

Awards

Roster
Reference:

See also
2007 NLL season

References

Arizona